Hammerboy (망치, Mangchi) is a Korean animated film. It premiered at the Big Apple Anime Fest on August 30, 2003, and went into wide release in South Korea on August 6, 2004. It was released in North America  on DVD by Central Park Media in 2007, with the original Korean track, and an English dub.

Plot
The story is about a boy called Mangchi. He is small, but he possesses a magical hammer that helps him get around all his problems. He therefore got the nickname of "Hammerboy". Mangchi lives on a small distant island called Candlestick because everywhere else has turned into a wasteland because of some big catastrophe. When Princess Poplar from the kingdom of Jemius is being pursued by henchmen of the conspirator Moonk, Hammerboy sides with her, ready to unleash all his latent powers in order to save humankind.

See also
 List of animated feature-length films

External links
 

2003 animated films
2003 films
South Korean animated films
2000s Korean-language films
Central Park Media
2000s South Korean films